Prairie is an unincorporated community in Skagit County, in the U.S. state of Washington.

History
A post office called Prairie was established in 1884, and remained in operation until 1925. The community took its name from a nearby prairie.

References

Unincorporated communities in Skagit County, Washington
Unincorporated communities in Washington (state)